Yip Sai Wing (born 19 August 1963) is a Hong Kong musician, best known as the drummer and co-founder of the rock band Beyond, formed with the lead vocalist Wong Ka Kui.

Biography
In 2003, Beyond won the "Best Original Film Song" at the 23rd Annual Hong Kong Film Awards for "Vast Skies" (長空 or "Chang Kong"), which was written by Yip and Wong Ka Keung.

Starting from 2002, he started to develop his career in mainland China. He married Chinese model Zhang Weiling in 2011.

Discography
 Beautiful Time Machine (EP) (美麗的時光機器) (2001)
 Remember You (EP) (2003)
 Leaves Turned Red (EP) (2005)
 Mercy (EP) (2009)

Filmography
 The Fun, the Luck & the Tycoon (1989)
 Happy Ghost IV (1990)
 Beyond's Diary (1991)
 Party of a Wealthy Family (1991)
 Human Pork Chop (2001)
 Modern Cinderella (2002)
 A Wicked Ghost III: The Possession (2002)
 Bust Family (2004)

References

External links
Hong Kong Vintage Pop Radio – Beyond
Beyond Music

Beyond (band) members
1963 births
Living people
Hong Kong Buddhists
20th-century drummers
20th-century Hong Kong male singers
21st-century drummers
21st-century Hong Kong male singers
Hong Kong drummers
Male drummers
Rock drummers
Hong Kong singer-songwriters
Cantopop singer-songwriters
Hong Kong rock musicians
Chinese rock singers
Hong Kong male television actors
Hong Kong male film actors